The Amazing Spider-Man is a 2012 American superhero film based on the Marvel Comics character Spider-Man and sharing the title of the character's longest-running comic book series of the same title. It is the fourth theatrical Spider-Man film produced by Columbia Pictures and Marvel Entertainment, a reboot of the series following Sam Raimi's 2002–2007 Spider-Man trilogy, and the first of the two The Amazing Spider-Man films. The film was directed by Marc Webb and written by James Vanderbilt, Alvin Sargent and Steve Kloves from a story by Vanderbilt, and stars Andrew Garfield as Peter Parker / Spider-Man alongside Emma Stone, Rhys Ifans, Denis Leary, Campbell Scott, Irrfan Khan, Martin Sheen, and Sally Field. In the film, after Parker is bitten by a genetically altered spider, he gains newfound, spider-like powers and ventures out to save the city from the machinations of the Lizard.

Development of the film began following the cancellation of Spider-Man 4 in January 2010, ending director Sam Raimi's Spider-Man film series that originally featured Tobey Maguire as the titular superhero. Columbia Pictures opted to reboot the franchise with the same production team along with Vanderbilt to stay on with writing the next Spider-Man film, while Sargent and Kloves helped with the script as well. During pre-production, the main characters were cast in 2010. New designs were introduced from the comics, such as artificial web-shooters. Using Red Digital Cinema Camera Company's RED Epic camera, principal photography started in December 2010 in Los Angeles before moving to New York City. The film entered post-production in April 2011. 3ality Technica provided 3D image processing, while Sony Pictures Imageworks handled CGI effects. This was also the final American film to be scored by James Horner and released during his lifetime, three years before his death on June 22, 2015 from an aircraft accident, as well as the penultimate film for both production designer J. Michael Riva and one of the producers Laura Ziskin, who died on June 7, 2012, and June 12, 2011, respectively. J. Michael Riva's last film as production designer was Django Unchained, released five months later and Ziskin's last film as producer was The Butler, released one year later in 2013.

Sony Pictures Entertainment built a promotional website, releasing many previews and launching a viral marketing campaign, among other moves. Tie-ins included a video game by Beenox and Activision. The film premiered on June 30, 2012, in Tokyo, and was released in the United States on July 3, ten years after the release of Spider-Man (2002), in 2D, 3D, and IMAX 3D formats. It received mostly positive reviews from critics, who praised Garfield's performance as Spider-Man, the chemistry between Stone and Garfield, the visual effects, and musical score, however criticism was directed towards some of the plot elements. The film was a box office success, grossing $758 million worldwide, becoming the seventh highest-grossing film of 2012. A sequel, The Amazing Spider-Man 2, was released on May 2, 2014. Garfield and Ifans reprised their roles in the MCU film Spider-Man: No Way Home (2021) which dealt with the concept of the multiverse and linked that franchise to the Raimi and Webb installments.

Plot

A young Peter Parker discovers that his father, business tycoon Richard Parker's study has been burgled. Peter's parents gather hidden documents, take Peter to the home of his Aunt May and Uncle Ben, and mysteriously leave. Years later, a teenage Peter attends Midtown Science High School; he is intelligent but socially awkward and often bullied. He also has a crush on Gwen Stacy, who returns his feelings.

Learning that his father is friends with Dr. Curt Connors, a scientist at Oscorp in the field of cross-species genetics, Peter sneaks into Oscorp, where he is bitten by a genetically modified spider. He then discovers he has developed spider-like abilities, such as superhuman strength, sharp senses, agility, and speed. Peter studies his father's papers and visits Connors, whose right arm is amputated above the elbow. Peter reveals he is Richard's son and gives Connors his father's "decay rate algorithm," the missing piece in Connors' experiments on regenerating limbs. At home, Peter and Ben argue, and Peter leaves. At a convenience store, Peter is confronted by the miserly cashier. A third man then robs the store, and Peter allows him to escape to get back at the cashier, but the robber encounters Uncle Ben who is searching for Peter. Uncle Ben is shot by the robber, and then Peter arrives and his Uncle dies in his arms. Peter uses his new abilities to track down criminals matching the killer's description. He creates a mask and spandex suit to hide his identity. He also builds mechanical web-shooters out of wristwatches to attach to his arms/wrists. At dinner with Gwen's family, he discovers her father is police captain George Stacy, who dislikes the new vigilante hero.

Peter reveals his identity to Gwen, and they kiss. After seeing success with the lab rats using lizard DNA, Connors' superior Ratha demands Connors begin human trials immediately. Connors refuses to rush the drug-testing procedure and put innocent people at risk. Ratha fires Connors and decides to test his serum at a Veterans Administration hospital. In an act of desperation, Connors tries the formula on himself. After passing out, he awakens to find his missing arm has regenerated. Discovering that Ratha is on his way to the hospital, Connors goes to intercept him. By the time he gets to the Williamsburg Bridge, he has become a violent humanoid reptile. Peter, now calling himself Spider-Man, saves the people on the bridge from Connors' attack. Following a battle in the sewer, the Lizard learns Spider-Man's real identity and attacks Peter at school. Police start a manhunt for both Spider-Man and the Lizard. They eventually corner Spider-Man, leading Captain Stacy to discover that Spider-Man is Peter and lets him go to stop the Lizard. The Lizard plans to make all humans reptilian by releasing a chemical cloud from Oscorp's tower, to eliminate the weaknesses he believes plague humanity.

Gwen creates an antidote, which Peter disperses, restoring Connors and his victims to normal, but not before the Lizard fatally wounds Captain Stacy. Before his death, Captain Stacy asks that Peter avoid Gwen to keep her safe. Peter initially does so, but seeing as they're both unhappy, hints to her that he may see her after all.

In a mid-credits scene, an incarcerated Connors speaks with a man in the shadows who asks if Peter knows the truth about his father. Connors does not know and demands that Peter be left alone, before the man disappears.

Cast

 Andrew Garfield as Peter Parker / Spider-Man: A intellectually-gifted yet socially-introverted teenager struggling to find his place in life ever since his parents died when he was a child. When Peter sneaks inside the Oscorp building where his father worked, a genetically-enhanced spider bites him on the back of his neck, giving him inhuman abilities, similar to that of a spider's. After his uncle's murder at the hands of a thief, he takes up the mantle of a masked vigilante, "Spider-Man," who targets street-level criminals using his super-human abilities and specially-constructed wrist-worn devices named "web-shooters." Initially using his alter-ego to hunt down his uncle's killer, he is later compelled to use his abilities to stop the growing threat of the "Lizard". Garfield described Parker as someone he can relate to and stated that the character had been an important influence on him since he was little. Garfield said in interviews, including one in which he was interviewed by Maguire, that when he watched the film Spider-Man when he was younger, he would jokingly recite Maguire's lines in the mirror with a friend who joked that he would never be Spider-Man. On accepting the role Garfield explained, "I see it as a massive challenge in many ways... To make it authentic. To make the character live and breathe in a new way. The audience already has a relationship with many different incarnations of the character. I do, as well. I'm probably going to be the guy in the movie theater shouting abuse at myself. But I have to let that go. No turning back. And I wouldn't want to." After taking the role, Garfield studied the movements of athletes and spiders and tried to incorporate them, saying Parker is "a boy/spider in terms of how he moves, and not just in the suit." He did yoga and Pilates for the role in order to be as flexible as possible. Garfield admitted to shedding a tear when first wearing his costume and that he tried to imagine "a much better actor's face in that suit" because seeing himself as Spider-Man "didn't make sense to him". He said, "I didn’t think that the spandex would make me so emotional, but it did." He described the suit as "uncomfortable" and said that he wasn't allowed to wear anything underneath it because it was so skintight, although later clarified that he wore underpants while in the suit. When filming, Garfield explained that he had four months of training and described his physical roles on stunts as terribly challenging and exhausting. 
 Max Charles plays a young Peter Parker.
 Emma Stone as Gwen Stacy: A high school classmate and love interest of Parker's, a smart and charismatic girl who is the chief Intern at Oscorp. For the role, Stone kept her natural blonde hair color, rather than maintaining her usual dyed red hair. She felt that she had a responsibility to educate herself on Spider-Man, admitting she "hadn't read the comic book growing up, and my experience was with the Sam Raimi movies... I always assumed that Mary Jane was his first love", and having only been familiar with her The Help co-star Bryce Dallas Howard's portrayal in Spider-Man 3. Stone said, "There's a part of me that really wants to please people [who] love Spider-Man or Gwen Stacy and want her to be done justice. I hope they'll give me license to interpret her my way."
 Rhys Ifans as Dr. Curt Connors / Lizard: One of Oscorp's leading scientific minds and former partner of Peter's late father Richard Parker who attempts to engineer a revolutionary regeneration serum to help regrow limbs and human tissue. Something goes wrong, and he is transformed into a large reptilian monster. Ifans said his character spends the majority of the film as a human. While playing the 9-foot-tall reptile, Ifans was required to wear a CGI suit. Initially, a large stunt double was used as a stand-in for the role, but Ifans insisted on portraying the transformed character. Commenting on the technology used to bring his character to life, Ifans continued, "I had a green suit on, and then this cardboard head, and these small claws... Every time you see the Lizard, the technology is so advanced now that when the Lizard's eyes move, they're my eyes. If I frown or show any emotion, they're my emotions. That's how spectacularly advanced technology is." Ifans said that he voiced the man-beast as well, explaining, "I'm sure the voice will be toyed with in the eventual edits, but when I was shooting the CGI moments when I wasn't human when I was Lizard, I looked like a crash-test dummy in a green leotard thing. There were many moments when I had to speak to Andrew Garfield and Emma Stone as the Lizard."
 Denis Leary as George Stacy:Gwen's father, a police captain who hunts both Spider-Man out of distrust and the Lizard for his rampage. Leary explained that he did not know much about Spider-Man in the comics and was "more of a Batman guy. Not the '60s [TV version], but the dark Batman. But my wife was a Spider-Man nut, which was why I went to [see the] Tobey Maguire ones." He added that long before he was cast as George Stacy his friend Jeff Garlin, a Spider-Man fan, "said to me, 'The first time I met you, I thought you were George Stacy!' This was like 30 years ago. I was like, 'What?!'" Director Webb said of his casting, "[W]e all trust Denis Leary. He's got this attitude, but you love him."
 Campbell Scott as Richard Parker: Peter's late father. He is a businessman and scientist who worked for Oscorp, his research being the Spider-venom cross species experiment said to heal or cure any sickness, one of the spiders he created ends up biting his son granting him his abilities.
 Irrfan Khan as Rajit Ratha: An Oscorp executive, Connors' immediate superior. Khan said he was offered what he described as this "pivotal role" after appearing in the TV drama series In Treatment. Webb described himself as a fan of the actor when watching the series along with the films The Namesake and The Warrior. Khan said he was uninterested in the project at first, but that his sons were excited about it and insisted he take the role.
 Martin Sheen as Ben Parker: Peter's uncle and Richard's brother. Sheen admitted he was unfamiliar with Spider-Man other than Maguire's portrayal, and knew little of the character Ben Parker except for knowing Cliff Robertson had played the part. Sheen described his character as a surrogate father, saying, "I'm dealing with this adolescent who is having problems with changes, with hormones changing and his getting out of hand. I have to give him the marching orders and so forth." Webb said, "You think of Martin Sheen as President Bartlet [of TV's The West Wing]. He has that sense of benevolent authority, but there's something else that's important, in terms of the dynamic that I wanted to explore, vis-à-vis Peter's relationship with his absent parents." Webb felt that unlike the scientifically inclined Peter, Uncle Ben represented the blue-collar working man, a gap that could create a dynamic between the characters.
 Sally Field as May Parker: Ben Parker's wife and Peter's aunt. Field said the main reason she felt she had to be in the film was because of producer Laura Ziskin (they worked together on the 1985 film Murphy's Romance) because she had an instinct that this was to be Ziskin's last film. After Ziskin's death Field expressed her gratitude at being a part of both Ziskin's first and last films. Director Webb felt that "when you cast someone like Sally, they come with a certain level of awareness and real genuine affection, which for Aunt May is an incredibly important thing to have." Webb said that while "we all love Aunt May", he wanted to create tension between May and Peter. "He's got bruises on his face, and what happens at that moment? That can create some tension, but you want there to be love there. That's what someone like Sally Field gives you."

Chris Zylka portrays Flash Thompson, a high school bully who is also the captain of the Midtown Science High basketball team and typically picks on Parker. On playing the role, Zylka said, "You just try to focus. As an artist or as an actor, you just try to focus and stay in that world and block it all out." Embeth Davidtz portrays Peter's mother, Mary Parker. Leif Gantvoort plays the burglar who robs the convenience store and then kills Uncle Ben, and Michael Barra plays T-Bone, the store clerk. Tom Waite plays Nicky, a thug whom Peter mistakes for his uncle's killer. Hannah Marks portrays Missy Kallenback, a shy girl who has a crush on Peter. Kelsey Chow's brief role is simply credited as "Hot Girl" during the end credits of the film, but the actress revealed to media outlets around the time of the film's release that her character is in fact Sally Avril. Similarly, C. Thomas Howell's character is credited as "Jack's Father" at the end of the film (Jack being a boy that Spider-Man rescues on the Williamsburg Bridge) but he is referred to as Troy by one of his fellow construction workers in the film itself. Unlike the previous films, J. Jonah Jameson does not appear. Spider-Man co-creator Stan Lee has a cameo appearance, as he did in the previous films. At the 2011 Dallas Comic Con, Lee detailed that he plays a librarian listening to music on his headphones while stamping books, oblivious to the ongoing battle. Michael Massee, who previously worked with Marvel as Dr. Bruce Banner in the Ultimate Avengers animated film series, plays the mysterious man in the shadows who talks with Connors in his prison cell in a teaser scene during the end credits. As to the man's identity, director Marc Webb said, "It's intentionally mysterious. And I invite speculation..." In The Amazing Spider-Man 2, the character was revealed to be Gustav Fiers. Michael Papajohn, who played Dennis Carradine, Uncle Ben's apparent killer in the 2002 film, has a cameo as Alfred, Dr. Ratha's limo driver, thus being the only actor (aside from Stan Lee) of the Sam Raimi films to play a role in the reboot film. Papajohn originally asked to reprise the role as Uncle Ben's killer, but the part was given to Gantvoort.

Kari Coleman, Charlie DePew, Skyler Gisondo and Jacob Rodier portray the Stacy family: Helen Stacy, Philip Stacy, Howard Stacy, and Simon Stacy respectively.

Production

Development

Following the release of Spider-Man 3 (2007), Sony Pictures Entertainment had announced a May 6, 2011 release date for Sam Raimi's next film in the earlier series. By this time, screenwriters James Vanderbilt, David Lindsay-Abaire and Gary Ross had written several rejected versions of a script and Ziskin's husband Alvin Sargent, who co-wrote the second and third films, was working on yet another attempt. Raimi wanted John Malkovich to play his next villain. However, on January 11, 2010, Columbia Pictures and Marvel Studios announced that rather than continue the earlier saga, they were rebooting the series with a new cast and crew. Industry reports claimed that Raimi had admitted that he could not meet the scheduled release date and retain creative integrity. Avi Arad, Matt Tolmach and Ziskin continued as producers.

Arad later explained, "We were working on what we called Spider-Man 4 and it was the same team [as with the first three films]. The problem was we didn't have a story that was strong enough and warranted ... another movie. And Sam Raimi ... realized we [didn't] have a good reason to make another one. And between [him] and Tobey and obviously the studio, we all went into it not feeling good about the next story." Tolmach said one reason to restart the series was that the producers felt the core Spider-Man story was that of a boy becoming a man. Screenwriter Steve Kloves did a polish of Sargent's script, saying he had originally declined the opportunity to do so but relented "as a favor" to the filmmakers. "I also really wanted to write for Emma Stone, because I like to write for women and I particularly like Emma," he explained. "So ...I did basically character and dialogue, and that was enjoyable for me. So that was my hand in it. And I did a little plot work, but a lot of the plot was done." He did "a little bit" of dialog for Peter Parker / Spider-Man. In April 2012, writer-director Paul Feig said that Webb "invited me on set, and I did a little bit of writing for that movie, for one of the high school scenes".

Days after announcing Raimi's departure, the studio announced that Webb, whose previous film 500 Days of Summer was his directorial debut, would direct the reboot. Kathryn Bigelow and David Fincher were considered to direct the film. Tolmach, now president of Columbia Pictures and Amy Pascal, co-chairman of Sony Pictures Entertainment, said they looked for a director who could give sharp focus to Parker's life. Webb said he "was a little sceptical at first—you feel the presence of those other movies. But then I was like, 'How could I walk away from this? What an opportunity!'" Webb said in the press release announcing him that, "Sam Raimi's virtuoso rendering of Spider-Man is a humbling precedent to follow and build upon. The first three films are beloved for good reason. But I think the Spider-Man mythology transcends not only generations but directors as well. I am signing on not to 'take over' from Sam. That would be impossible. Not to mention arrogant. I'm here because there's an opportunity for ideas, stories, and histories that will add a new dimension, canvas, and creative voice to Spider-Man." Webb felt Spider-Man is different from the Harry Potter franchise, which is based on a few novels and "more like James Bond" because "there's so much material in Spider-Man that there are so many stories to tell and so many characters." He described the film as "not a remake" explaining that "we're not making Sam's movie again. It's a different universe and a different story with different characters."

Casting

In May 2010, The Hollywood Reporter said the actors who met with Webb to be considered for the lead role included Jamie Bell, Alden Ehrenreich, Frank Dillane, Andrew Garfield and Josh Hutcherson. In June 2010 the Los Angeles Times reported that the shortlist had expanded to include Aaron Johnson and Anton Yelchin. At least Bell, Ehrenreich, Garfield, Yelchin, Logan Lerman and Michael Angarano had screen tests. Joe Jonas also auditioned. On July 1, 2010, the choice of Garfield was confirmed. Webb stated that he felt he knew Garfield was the right choice when they were filming a cutscene where he was eating a cheeseburger while telling Gwen to calm down. Garfield said that he got the role as he decided to pretended to think he was doing auditioning for Spider-Man short film with friends to ease off the pressure.

Sony then held auditions for the role of the young Peter, who needed to resemble Garfield. Webb said, "I think we saw the origin of Spider-Man before but not the origin of Peter Parker." Webb felt that when you try to build the film you must build the protagonist from the ground up. That's why he wanted Parker to begin as a child.

It was reported originally that the film would feature both Mary Jane Watson and Gwen Stacy as love interests, but the website The Wrap later reported that only Gwen Stacy would appear. In August 2010, the list of candidates included Lily Collins, Ophelia Lovibond, and Imogen Poots, with Teresa Palmer, Emma Roberts, and Mary Elizabeth Winstead cited by The Hollywood Reporter as "potentially in the mix". In September 2010, Variety reported that the shortlist had expanded to include Stone and Mia Wasikowska. The shortlist was reported to then include Dianna Agron, Georgina Haig and Dominique McElligott. On October 5, 2010, the choice of Stone was confirmed. Webb noted that the chemistry between Stone and Garfield made her the clear choice. That chemistry inspired their off-screen romance.

On October 11, 2010, Rhys Ifans was confirmed to be the unnamed villain, and two days later his character was revealed to be Dr. Curt Connors / The Lizard. Arad said that Lizard is his favorite Spider-Man villain, and he had long wanted to use him in a film. Well before the choice of villain, Arad had had conceptual drawings prepared for the character. Michael Fassbender was originally considered for the role.

In November, Martin Sheen was reported to be Uncle Ben while Sally Field was in negotiations to play Aunt May. Field said that that she took the role of Aunt May as a favor to her friend Laura Ziskin. That same month, Denis Leary was reported to accept the role of George Stacy. In December 2010, Campbell Scott and Julianne Nicholson were in negotiations to play Peter's parents. Khan was originally reported as playing Van Adder until the character's name was revealed to be Dr. Ratha. Embeth Davidtz then replaced Nicholson. Annie Parisse was originally reported to play "the villain's wife", and Miles Elliot was reported to portray Billy Connors, son of Dr. Connors; but they did not appear in the final cut of the film.

Design
Webb felt a responsibility to reinvent Spider-Man. One departure from the preceding trilogy was to have Spider-Man build artificial web-shooters, as the character does in the comics. Costume Designer Kym Barrett was brought onto the project and worked closely with Webb to redesign the costume with realism in mind. The new iteration of the iconic suit featured golden eye lenses made from sunglasses. The soles of the shoes were made from cut off asics running shoes that were painted to match the pattern of the costume. The web shooters and the civilian wrist bands Peter wears in the film are made from every day wristwatch parts. The costume also features a fully screen printed hex pattern to make it resemble athletic wear. In February 2011, with the launch of the official website, the title and first official image of Garfield as Spider-Man depicting both his costume and web-shooters for the first time were revealed. Writer Geoff Boucher of the Los Angeles Times was skeptical of the change, feeling that it was too hard to believe that a financially strapped young man could conceive a wrist-worn device that can instantly produce a strand of synthetic webbing and noted "the suit lives up to the challenge of being different from the Sam Raimi films but not too different from the classic suit that stands as one of the great comic-book costumes ever." Matt Goldberg of Collider admitted that he was not crazy about the costume, explaining that the bug-yellow eyes felt weird to him and the mesh-pattern felt too busy. He explained that the design of the gloves caused flashbacks to the Spider-Man 2099 costume which he did not like, although he felt that the web-shooters looked fine. Webb explained that he felt that "the web-shooters were able to dramatize Peter's intellect". Webb paid attention to the question of "How would a kid make it?" and then took some license with it. About the new costume, Webb explained that he and the crew "wanted a design that would make the body longer and more lithe, more of an acrobat, someone incredibly agile and the legs of the spider [symbol on the chest] were something we used to emphasize that." He revealed that the film used varying suits for different lighting conditions. They made the webbing on the costume a little darker. Webb stated that "With the costume and the web-shooters we wanted to emphasize that these are things that Peter Parker made". Webb also looked at the Mark Bagley art in Ultimate Spider-Man for the hero's body.

While Webb introduced a few elements from Ultimate Spider-Man, he wanted to keep the mainstream version of Gwen Stacy instead of that world's punk rocker, though he states that the "texture" of the romantic relationship between her and Peter is based on that of the Ultimate versions of Peter and Mary Jane.

The release of Lizard merchandise designs along with unconfirmed concept art featuring a humanoid-shape with a layer of scales on top instead of a pronounced snout (similar to a dinosaur or crocodile) as in the most recent comics, produced a mixed reaction. Many commenters compared it to other fictional characters instead of his rendering in comics. Russ Fischer of /Film described the character as looking more "Steve Ditko derived" (the character's original artist). Webb felt that there are different incarnations of Lizard in the comic book. He felt that he should do it without the snout because he was interested more in human emotions and wanted to keep Rhys' presence in the creature. Webb wanted him to have emotion, have a face and have feeling. He stated "that in a comic book, you just put that thing up there, and you can say, oh, thought bubble, whatever. But when you try to do that and make it look real, it's a different challenge, and I'm creating a movie, I'm not creating a comic book. That was part of the design."

Webb "wanted to do something that felt more contemporary, and was less based in representing panels from the comics" and focus on spirit over style.

The "decay rate algorithm" that Peter Parker's father worked on in the film was inspired by the real-life Gompertz–Makeham law of mortality. Dr. James Kakalios, a professor at the University of Minnesota known for his book The Physics of Superheroes, discusses using some of his knowledge in creating the equation while serving as one of the film's scientific consultants. He mentions that the algorithm utilizes a variant of the Gompertz equation multiplied with some "mathematical glitter" to give it a more complex look in the film.

Filming

Principal photography began on December 6, 2010, in Los Angeles. The working title was Fiona's Tale. The 90-day shoot included two weeks in New York City, while the bulk of filming occurred in and around Los Angeles, including such locations as the Henry Fonda Theater in Hollywood, St. John Bosco High School's Gym, Immanuel Presbyterian Church in Mid-Wilshire, and various locations around South Pasadena, San Pedro and Woodland Hills. Sony Entertainment spokesman Steve Elzer explained, "[T]here is a comfort level in producing a project of this size and scope on your own backlot ... Basing the film on the lot also makes it easier for producers to interact with Sony's in-house visual effects team, and gives the studios greater control of quality and security."

Some location shooting took place in New York City. The Alexander Hamilton U.S. Custom House served as the exterior for NYPD headquarters, and an apartment house at 15 West 81st Street, on Manhattan's Upper West Side, was used as the exterior for the home of Gwen Stacy and her family. A row of houses on Fuller Place in the Brooklyn neighborhood of Windsor Terrace stood in for the Forest Hills, Queens neighborhood of Ben and May Parker. A web-swinging stunt sequence takes place along the Riverside Drive Viaduct in Harlem.

The film was the first Hollywood production to be filmed with the Red Digital Cinema Camera Company's RED Epic camera and was shot in 3-D at 5K resolution. Cinematographer John Schwartzman had this to say about the camera: "Today was Epic, Monday December 6 marks the first day the Red Epic camera was used to shoot a major studio motion picture. I can say for certainty the camera does exist and boy is it ready for primetime, as a matter of fact it's a true game changer." Schwartzman felt that the 3D would have been impossible without it. He said, "I can tell you without these cameras it would be impossible to move a 3D rig in the ways that THIS story demands, if Jim and the crew hadn't made these cameras available to us I don't think we could have shot this movie the way our director envisioned it in 3D." Webb wanted cameras small enough to fit on the rigs and swing around very fast, saying that the "RED Epic cameras were the right cameras to do that." Webb continued that "you need to shoot it with a level of velocity and 3D cameras can be very large... and so we need those cameras to mount on rigs that could fly to the air and run to the streets in a certain pace. That allowed us to do it." The Amazing Spider-Man climax was filmed in a 1:78:1 aspect ratio for its IMAX DMR release.

In April 2011, Stone revealed that the cinematography had wrapped and that post-production began in May although some reshooting took place in New York City in November 2011 and in Los Angeles in December 2011.

Stunts
Webb stated that he and the crew wanted to keep the stunts more grounded physically, a challenge for a superhuman character. The stunt performers included the Armstrong family, Vic and Andy, along with Richard Norton who plays a SWAT team member. Andy Armstrong was the stunt coordinator while Vic was the second unit director. To determine how Spider-Man should swing, Andy videotaped an Olympic Games gymnast swinging on a horizontal bar. Andy noted that in the computer-generated swing in the earlier Spider-Man films, "he swings down at the same speed as he swings up," and this "constant" speed is unlike a real gymnast's movement where "he's accelerating until he reaches the bottom, then as he starts to come up, he's decelerating until he gets to the top of his swing and he actually gets negative gravity, where he'll go weightless for a second, and then the next swing starts, and it becomes another violent swing again." Vic felt that Spider-Man's moves were comparable to those of Tarzan, and he wanted to add that in the film. While filming in New York City, they swung a man through traffic down the street. Then, while the crew built a rig hundreds of feet long over Riverside Drive in Harlem, Andy built a car rig with a series of wires to help with effects which Webb said required an "incredible wealth of acrobatics". These rigs were over 200–300 feet long and demanded months of rehearsals and design. According to Andy, operating the rigs "was a combination of a lot of human skills and mechanical engineering." The purpose of the rigs was to depict Spider-Man's swing in a way that wasn't computer-generated. Garfield was reported to be involved with some of the stunts. Arad explained that "Andrew is not only a brilliant actor but he is a sportsman. This gave us the opportunity to try things with him that were it not so it would have been almost impossible."

Effects

The company 3ality Technica of Burbank, California produced some of the equipment. The film was reported to be the first to adopt 3ality Digital's TS-5 wireless and handheld beamsplitter mirror rig. 3ality technology helped make it possible to avoid 2D to 3D conversion. Webb wanted a new 3D experience for Spider-Man: "Because we're shooting in 3D, I wanted to conceive of certain things very specifically for 3D. There's an experimental component to 3D that's fascinating and we're experimenting with generating that point of view – so you feel what Peter Parker feels, you feel what Spider-Man feels when he's jumping over buildings and over the streets." He felt that Spider-Man was ideal for 3D, admitting that they "started making the movie around the time Avatar came out" which made every studio want 3D. This was Webb's first film using the technique, and he did not want a force-fit or clumsy conversion as he had seen in other films. Webb cited childhood films such as Creature from the Black Lagoon and House of Wax for inspirations to push the 3D in his film even further than the type of depth that James Cameron uses in his film.

The Vancouver branch of Sony Pictures Imageworks was responsible for the digital touch-up. The group improved the sewer and high school battle scene with many of Spider-Man's poses and environments that were used in the film. The comic book was cited as a basic source for Spider-Man's poses. The visual designers helped bring the Lizard to life by first building a digital version of a production design maquette. Many of the staff were involved with the process. They also started by thinking about lizard biology and how his muscles would work. A large man referred to as "Big John" stood in as the character during shooting, performing much of the interaction with other characters. The computer-generated Lizard replaced him in post-production. The creators would then fuse the design of the Lizard with the actor Rhys Ifans. Ifans then used motion capture for the Lizard's speaking parts, which Webb found challenging to incorporate into the character's final version.

Music

James Horner scored the film. Webb described Horner's first musical cue as "spectacular". Webb said, "I wanted to create a score that felt massive and huge but also intimate and small.". Webb admitted that Horner had the score "nailed in an hour and a half". The film also features the Coldplay song "'Til Kingdom Come" from the album X&Y. In May 2012, Sony Classical revealed details about the soundtrack. Critics like Filmtracks.com's Christian Clemmensen felt that Horner's approach to writing the score for The Amazing Spider-Man is "remarkably intelligent" and that "Horner's mix of the electronic elements into the major ensemble cues is tastefully handled". Clemmensen also felt that the piano is "the heart of the score, following Parker's relationships in their tender and mysterious turns".

Marketing

Merchandising

Spider-Man and Lizard PEZ dispensers were revealed at the November 2011 Comic-Con first depicted the film's Lizard. In December 2011, it was revealed that Mega Brands had the rights to produce construction sets. A Marvel Select Spider-Man action figure by Diamond Select Toys was announced in January 2012—the fifth Marvel Select Spider-Man figure, but the first based on a film. The first look at a Hasbro action figure of the film's version of Spider-Man was revealed at the July 2011 Comic-Con. Hasbro made a radio control speed-climbing figure. Minimates made action figures from the film. Other companies releasing action figures for the film include Hot Toys, MediCom and Kaiyodo. OPI Products released a collection of The Amazing Spider-Man nail polish. Trading cards were also available.

CKE Restaurants, parent company of Carl's Jr. and Hardee's, helped sponsor the film. Chief marketing officer Brad Haley said they would market a new burger as part of the promotion. The burger was dubbed "The Amazing Grilled Cheese Bacon Burger". It was promoted through film-themed commercials and radio ads featuring Stan Lee. Spider-Man-themed premiums were offered as part of the Cool Kid's Combo. Tours and PlayStation 3 game prizes were part of the promotion along with a video game. Stan Lee then helped spread the word that fans would also have been treated for a free Amazing Grilled Cheese Bacon Burger in Independence Day if dressed as Spider-Man.

Big Cola was reported to enter a deal for promoting the film. The Kellogg Company and the Keebler Company built marketing campaigns around clips from the film. Sony launched a new augmented reality mobile application for the film using Qualcomm's Vuforia platform. Sony's Dwight Caines felt that the "use of augmented reality technology is a fun way of embracing the 3D aspects of the movie while nurturing the playful kid inside all of us who wants to collect items from their favorite superhero character to share with their friends and family." Twizzlers challenged fans nationwide to help the hero build a virtual web of Twizzlers Twists to unlock prizes and exclusive content. D-Box Technologies provide motion simulation for the film in select theaters.

As is common in Sony films, Sony product placements abounded, replacing the ubiquitous Apple Computer products often used by other studios. The film's mobile phones, tablets, monitors and laptops all came from other Sony divisions. Other placements included Microsoft's Bing search engine.

Previews

A teaser trailer was leaked on the Internet and aired at San Diego Comic-Con International in July 2011, attached to the superhero film Captain America: The First Avenger. Rob Keyes of Screen Rant felt that "it takes on a noticeably different tone from that of Raimi trilogy of Spider-Man movies, and presents itself in a similar fashion to what Christopher Nolan did with Batman Begins." Some writers observed that the trailer very closely resembles the 2008 video game Mirror's Edge. After the third trailer was released, Webb defended the point of view footage, saying it was an early rendering and that the CGI was still in production.

A "sneak peek screening" of The Amazing Spider-Man was held on February 6, 2012, in 13 cities internationally: Berlin, London, Los Angeles, Madrid, Mexico City, Moscow, New York City, Paris, Rio de Janeiro, Rome, Seoul, Sydney and Tokyo. On January 8, 2012, the Spider-Man logo appeared on some of the world's most iconic buildings, such as the Sydney Opera House, the Colosseum of Rome, the Kremlin in Moscow and the Arc de Triomphe in Paris. The screening revealed a second trailer in 3D, which thereafter appeared online. Glen Levy of Time magazine felt that the trailer's "dialogue goes hand in hand with the action, rather than be dominated by it" and that the action scenes from the film looked "polished and slick". The special screening included an eight and a half minute extended trailer. Scott Mantz of Access Hollywood felt that the extended footage seemed edgier and more character-driven and that "the Lizard looks like a great villain". Peter Sciretta of /Film said that the trailers had left him "impressed" and had captured a feeling of dark naturalism alongside Spider-Man's trademark wisecracking. With the second official trailer and the sizzle reel, Webb felt that it was important to provide a more specific idea of the film, such as showcasing Peter and Gwen's relationship and the visual effects, just to display the attitude of the film that he and the crew were trying to create. On February 7, 2012, it was reported that the latest official trailer revealed a link to the viral marketing internet site for the film.

A third official trailer debuted on iTunes on May 3, 2012. The trailer was attached to the 3D première of The Avengers, the day after. The trailer contains what most reporters called a better and more fleshed Lizard. Adam Chitwood of Collider said, "The webslinging has an edge to it and The Lizard has much more texture. I like Andrew Garfield a whole lot, and the biggest draw for me here is the character work between Garfield and Emma Stone. They look to have some great chemistry and Garfield brings out a... side of Peter Parker that we didn't really see in Sam Raimi's trilogy." Sandy Schaefer of ScreenRant felt that "the darker color palette and 3D visuals shown here look overall quite crisp, even without the benefit of the big screen." Webb felt that "there's a small, intimate little indie movie at the heart of Spider-Man".

On May 9, 2012, the first television trailer was revealed which teased a "4 minute Super Preview" on NBC with the season premiere of America's Got Talent on May 14. The super preview revealed Spider-Man saving a boy near a bridge. Fans and writers rated that scene the highest in the trailer. Angela Watercutter of Wired called the rescue scene "pretty freaking epic." Kofi Outlaw of Screen Rant felt that the biggest thing to note "is the tone and composition of the film" and that most of the footage "manages to showcase a version of Peter Parker/Spider-Man that is both familiar and fresh."

A six-minute 3D preview was tied in with IMAX 3D showings of Men in Black 3. Sony's Rory Bruer explained that the audience of Men in Black 3 should be a perfect match for this footage and that the six minutes should get everyone excited.

Viral campaign

The main viral marketing site was revealed in the second trailer in February 2012. The official Twitter account revealed a scavenger hunt by posting "Property of Peter Parker... Lost" with the longitude and latitude coordinates of direct markets in major US cities. The missing items included a JanSport backpack. One of the clues hidden in the backpack was a link to a page on the viral site that unlocked countdown timers for the cities of Los Angeles, New York City, Atlanta, Denver, Seattle and Phoenix, Arizona. Once the countdown was up, each of the city-specific Twitter accounts for the marketing campaign sent out five locations in each city. A person at each spot waited to give the first person with the password a package and the tag-name "operative". These operatives painted the Spider-Man logo as graffiti. The operatives then could view a scene related to the film. The main viral website revealed hints to other websites, such as a photo blog that expressed Peter Parker's point of view. An unlocked puzzle there revealed the words "evolve", "through" and "engineering" which when put together led to another website with design sketches on how to build a web-shooter.

A Daily Bugle website revealed Denis Leary as George Stacy, lamenting the appearance of the wall-crawler and asking whoever spots Spider-Man to e-mail the police. The site hosted the best fan-made Spider-Man scenes. People who uploaded images of "Spider-Man" on the "Webbed Menace" viral site received a poster that sent them to a website for a boxing gym called "Jerera's Boxing Gym". The gym was funded by Peter Parker's school. A viral website of that class was discovered. Entering the correct password revealed Parker's class schedule. The Midtown High School site then revealed a Twitter user tracking down Lizard and asked people in Los Angeles, New York City, Atlanta, Chicago, Salt Lake City, Las Vegas, Phoenix, Austin, Tampa, Minneapolis and New Orleans to stay tuned for details. A viral site for Oscorp Industries was also available. The Twitter account that coordinated a nationwide effort to track Lizard sightings revealed locations that had packages containing Connors' shredded lab coat, an Oscorp ID badge and scientific samples of reptilian skin. When unscrambling the letters listed on each sample, the words "animal dynamics lab" led players to a new Oscorp Industries site focusing on a science program about reptile genetics. The site depicts Doctor Connors search for interns who could begin applying on May 14. Completing the application and supplying the keyword "Mutagen" unveiled a Lizard featurette. The Oscorp Industries website contained puzzles that revealed two in-game documents, two video updates featuring Connors and a following cipher that as of July 2012 had yet to be cracked. From there images were then unscrambled, revealing a research project with spiders, a letter from Mary Parker to Richard Parker that exposed his workaholic habits and a Daily Bugle newspaper that contained notes about Oscorp.

On May 30, 2012, the third (and apparently final) set of challenges in the Animal Dynamics Lab was launched with two new video updates of Doctor Connors, an image of Richard and Mary Parker, letters from Rajit Ratha to Doctor Connors, one from Doctor Connors to Richard Parker and another note to Richard from Mary. On June 1, 2012, a Carl's Jr. in Glendale, California hosted the next viral campaign by decorating webs and declaring a crime scene due to Spider-Man's apprehension of a serial car and motorcycle thief. It was announced via The Mark of the Spider-Man Twitter feed, and with the code word "Web of Crime", a hidden message was discovered, entitled a "Spider cipher". The code name "adhere" named another sub-site of the Mark of the Spider-Man campaign that revealed crime reports.

Oliver Lyttleton of indieWire felt that viral ads such as the webbed menace website seemed a little forced and cribbed heavily from the example set by The Dark Knight with viral games. Silas Lesnick of SuperheroHype!, on the other hand, described the film's viral as "one of the most comprehensive film virals to date".

Philanthropy
T-shirts depicting the film's Spider-Man to help the cause for Stand Up to Cancer were available. Garfield wore the shirt, explaining that "these shirts underscore the idea that anyone has the power to be a hero. Cancer is one of our greatest villains. I'm proud to join others in standing up to this disease." Ziskin's death from cancer was used as inspiration for the cause. Sony created a website for the cause. Columbia Pictures teamed up with New York City cultural institutions to create "Spider-Man week" by helping out in the community.

Release

Theatrical
On February 10, 2010, Sony announced that the film would be released in 3D, RealD 3D And IMAX 3D on July 3, 2012. Release dates outside the US were moved up to June in other countries to increase first-week sales. Premieres took place in Tokyo, Japan on June 13. The film is rated PG-13 for sequences of action and violence.

Home media
The Amazing Spider-Man was released by Sony Pictures Home Entertainment on Blu-ray, Blu-ray 3D, DVD and digital download on November 9, 2012, in North America. These releases contain a ninety-minute behind-the-scenes documentary for the film along with UltraViolet download. Other special features include "Rite of Passage: The Amazing Spider-Man reborn" and "The Oscorp Archives - Production Art Gallery". The discs also contain audio commentary from Marc Webb, Avi Arad and Matt Tolmach. The deleted scenes included relationship-building between Peter and Connors which Joey Esposito of IGN thought gives the Lizard a sense of sympathy that is lacking in the final film. The Blu-ray/DVD combo pack contains three disks and also contains a second screen app for the iPad. Sony also included a limited edition gift set on November 9, 2012, containing four disks with the special editions along with figurines of Spider-Man and the Lizard from the film.

While released, the film was reported as dominating the sales chart on its first release until the end of November 11, 2012 while its rental chart had The Amazing Spider-Man at number two behind Prometheus. It then became number one in rental and dropped to number two in sales chart after its second week. FX has acquired the TV commercial rights to the film to air in late 2014. The film was included in "The Spider-Man Legacy Collection" of five Spider-Man films on 4K UHD Blu-Ray, released on October 17, 2017.

Reception

Box office 
The Amazing Spider-Man earned $262 million in North America and $495.9 million in other countries, for a worldwide total of $757.9 million. It is the 106th highest-grossing film, the seventh highest grossing film of 2012, the 19th highest-grossing superhero film, the fifth grossing Spider-Man film, the sixth highest grossing film distributed by Sony/Columbia and the highest grossing reboot of all time worldwide.

In North America, the film earned $7.5 million during its midnight run at 3,150 locations, including $1.2 million from 300 IMAX venues. On its opening day, a pre-holiday Tuesday, it set a Tuesday-gross record with $35 million (previously held by Transformers), which would eventually be topped in 2019 by Spider-Man: Far From Home with $39.3 million. The next day, the film dropped 33.4 percent to $23.3 million—the second highest non-opening Wednesday. Over the three-day weekend, it grossed $62 million. This pushed the film's six-day gross to $137 million, which was smaller than those of Transformers ($155.41 million) and Spider-Man 2 ($180.07 million) among past Fourth of July releases. Although the film did not match its predecessors, Sony Pictures stated, "In the world of re-launched franchises, this is a spectacular success by any measure". For example, both Batman Begins ($79.5 million) and X-Men: First Class ($69.9 million) (both were non 3D-movies) opened significantly below The Amazing Spider-Man. It remained at the number 1 spot for ten consecutive days, until the opening day of Ice Age: Continental Drift.

Outside North America, The Amazing Spider-Man grossed $51.1 million on its five-day opening weekend (June 27 – July 1, 2012) from 13 markets, with strong openings in many Asian countries. In India, it earned $6.0 million, a record opening for a Hollywood film. Its final box office collection in India was $20 million making it the eighth highest grossing Hollywood film in India of all time. Kercy Daruwala of Sony Pictures in India felt very confident that the presence of famed Indian actor Irrfan Khan would enhance attendance. Opening in an additional 61 markets, the film made $127.5 million over its second weekend. The movie ranked number one in over 30 countries. In Indonesia, it broke the opening-weekend record with $4.5 million while, in the UK, it opened to £11.1 million ($18.1 million) which is about equal with Spider-Man 3 (£11.8 million). In its last market, China, The Amazing Spider-Man grossed $33.3 million over its seven-day debut, which is more than Spider-Man 3s lifetime box office in China. China is also the movie's highest-grossing territory with $48.8 million.

Critical response 
 

The site's critical consensus reads, "A well-chosen cast and sure-handed direction allows The Amazing Spider-Man to thrill despite revisiting many of the same plot points from 2002's Spider-Man." On Metacritic, the film has an average score of 66 out of 100, based on 42 critics, indicating "generally favorable reviews". According to Rotten Tomatoes' yearly lists (by using a weighted formula of the critics review in the site), it was placed number 32 on its list of the all-time best comic book films in 2012 and had fallen to 36th in 2013. CinemaScore's audience graded it an "A−" on an A+ to F scale.

Jordan Mintzer of The Hollywood Reporter felt that the film was satisfying, explaining that Webb directed with emotional and comedic touches and provided a darker depiction and a stronger romance than the original. Boyd Van Hoeija of Variety described the film as a "mostly slick, entertaining and emotionally involving recombination of fresh and familiar elements". A columnist of The Village Voice, Chris Pakham felt that the film was faithful to the comics and that "Garfield's spindly physicality evokes the Marvel illustrations of the 1960s." Conversely, Lou Lemenick of the New York Post wrote that the film was dull and uninspiring and felt that it did not compare to Batman Begins and was "a pointless rehash in the mode of Superman Returns." New Yorker critic Anthony Lane described the film as "running out of nimbleness and fun, and the promise contained in its title seems ever more tendentious." Kenneth Turan of the Los Angeles Times called the film "memorable in pieces but not as a whole" and said that its best element is the relationship between Peter and Gwen, while the Lizard "is not quite an opponent for the ages."

Lisa Schwarzbaum of Entertainment Weekly gave the film an A− describing the film as "a friskier, sweeter-natured variation" when compared to Raimi's work. She explained that the most "amazing" element was not the "blockbuster wow!" but instead the "intimate awww." Claudia Puig of USA Today explained that "as a new chapter in the superpowered arachnid saga, it stands on its own quite nicely, focusing more on human emotions than on a panoply of special effects." She said "where Tobey Maguire in the original Spider-Man trilogy was earnest, Garfield's Spider-Man is whip-smart and likably cheeky, with an undercurrent of teenage angst." She also called the film "as much a coming-of-age story as a crime-fighting action saga." Christy Lemire of the Associated Press described Garfield's Spider-Man as an arrogant and misunderstood outsider, giving the film a "restless, reckless energy and a welcome sense of danger." She also concluded that Webb was a different sort of director, saying that while Webb's big set pieces lacked Raimi's imagination, they conveyed "emotional truth" and "a pervasive sense of humanity". However, Ty Burr of The Boston Globe felt that the film lacked the original's pop grace and the pulpy joy, saying the film was "dumbed down, tarted up" and "almost shockingly uninspired". Burr evaluated it as "the worst superhero film since Green Lantern". Colin Covert of the Star Tribune also felt that The Amazing Spider-Man is weaker than its predecessor and described it as "The Notebook in spandex". Roger Ebert of the Chicago Sun-Times felt that the reboot provided better reasons for why Peter Parker adopts his superhero role, even if the origin story didn't need to be told once again. He also remarked that it was "probably the second best" of the four Spider-Man films after Spider-Man 2, explaining that Lizard was lackluster compared to that film's villain, Doctor Octopus, and had the dramatic range of Godzilla.

Joe Morgenstern of The Wall Street Journal, pointed out that "the truly amazing thing is that most of what happens to Peter Parker in the first half of the film has already happened in previous chapters of the Spidey saga", that "what's old is old again." However, Randy Myers from the San Jose Mercury News found it "the best Spidey yet", describing it as "strong, bold and well-acted." He felt that a viewer couldn't help but feel déjà vu, but that the work shows greater "dimension". Dana Stevens at Slate magazine believed that the film was an "absolutely unnecessary" retelling of the origin story, although it avoided "the common comic-book adaptation trap of gloomy self-seriousness". Peter Travers of Rolling Stone also opined that the "unnecessary" reboot pulled stellar performances from Garfield and Stone and touches the heart.

Andrew Garfield received general praise for his performance. Bob Mondello of NPR said, "Here comes another Spider-dude: This Andrew Garfield guy. So he'd better be really something, right? Well, as it happens, he is." Tom Charity of CNN found Garfield's "combination of fresh-faced innocence, nervous agitation and wry humor ... immediately appealing." Stephanie Zacharek of Movieline said she "had no specific desire to see the series resuscitated. But watching Garfield and Stone made me think doing so wasn't such a bad idea". Mary F. Pols of Time said that even though the story was familiar Garfield and Webb made it feel "convincingly fresh and exciting."

Accolades

Themes and analysis

Webb described the film as "a story about a kid who grows up looking for his father and finds himself." Both Webb and star Garfield described Parker as an outsider by choice, someone hard to get close to. As in the early comic books, the character "is a science whiz. If you look back to the early Stan Lee and Steve Ditko comics, he's a nerd with big glasses," said Webb. He explained "the idea of what a nerd is has changed in 40 or 50 years. Nerds are running the world. Andrew Garfield made a movie [called The Social Network] about it. ... What was important in those early comics was this notion that Peter Parker is an outsider and how we define that in a contemporary context." Garfield compared his Spider-Man façade as a metaphor for internet anonymity, saying, "You feel the power of it, the power of not being seen, the power of the mask. Peter becomes witty when he's got that protective layer. It's like he's on a message board. He's got the anonymity of the Internet within that suit, and he can say whatever the @#!*% he likes, and he can get away with anything." Garfield tried to explore Parker as an orphan, whom he feels "are the strongest human beings on the planet." He said Parker is "a human hero [who] goes through all of the same struggles that we all have gone through, especially the skinny ones [who] want more power than they feel they have." He believes Parker represents "a very inspiring, aspirational character that symbolizes goodness—and how difficult it is to be good—but how worth it it is." Rhys Ifans compared this film to William Shakespeare's Hamlet on the grounds that Spider-Man can be redone over and over in different ways. He felt that they are similar in that they both represent meaningful archetypal young men grappling with the loss of their father. Critics like Claudia Puig of USA Today felt that Garfield's character as the superhero "embodies the nerdy Parker, the anguished fatherless teen and the cocky super-hero in equal doses". Boyd Hoij of Variety noted that Garfield's character as Spider-Man makes an interesting hero in the film because of how it establishes early on that Peter's growing pains along with his search for an identity are common to any teenager and that "his struggles involve real people—and real lives."

Stone described her character as "a daddy's girl" who is very responsible and protective of her family and loves science. She said of her character, "she offers Parker a world of stability, of a family unit not marred with parental loss and, beyond physical allure, the two forge an intellectual connection over their shared love of science." Her character, she explained, "is stuck between [her father] the Captain and Peter Parker and Spider-Man, who have different ways about going about finding justice in their lives" which she felt was a fun thing to explore. Dana Stevens of Slate described her character
"as the stuff of a comic nerd's dreams: a sweet, smart, wisecracking dame in demure sweaters, miniskirts, thigh-high stockings and boots."
Webb felt that the Lizard was the best villain because, "He's the literal embodiment of the theme of the movie, which is we all have a missing piece. He has no arm. Peter has no parents, and he fills that void with Spider-Man." Producer Avi Arad felt likewise, explaining, "[Y]ou look at Peter, he misses the parents, [and] Connors has one arm. ...[E]motionally, [it] is a very similar problem. It is a cautionary tale." Webb said that the Lizard "is not the worst villain on the planet. He's not a mustache-twirling guy who wants to terrorize people. He believes he's doing the right thing." Actor Rhys Ifans described his character as a flawed character comparable to Dr. Jekyll and Mr. Hyde. "Curt Connors is by no means an evil villain," Ifans stated. "He's not like the Batman villains, like the Joker, who are the embodiment of evil. Curtis Connors is a great man who makes a bad decision. ... [T]hat's the whole magic of the Spider-Man idea. These people are the embodiment of our flaws and our desires that lead to tragedy." Ifans described Connors as a force for good throughout his life: "He's a geneticist who wants to help people, like him, who are limbless. In his eagerness to advance that science, he makes a mistake and that's an occurrence we've seen throughout time, sometimes to our benefit, sometimes to our detriment." "...He is a broken man who wants to fix himself." Ifans added, "I'm not portraying a villain in any sense. Connors does feel cheated by God, and he's looking for answers in science. God seems to intervene."

Webb said that Oscorp Tower is pivotal as a part of a new mythology of the film. He liked that Parker was connected to the building in some way and to think of it as "a Tower of Babel in the middle of Manhattan that has something dark and seedy going on in there." The critic Roger Ebert described the place as a "typical comic-book mega-corporation with a madman at the top."

Legacy
The comic-book website Newsarama placed The Amazing Spider-Man on its top 10 list of comic-book films. Mark Hughes of Forbes ranked the film as the seventh greatest comic book superhero film being the highest Spider-Man film in the list while Jacob Hall of ScreenCrush ranked the film as 13th greatest modern Marvel film being the lowest Spider-Man film in the list.

A scientist from Wake Forest Baptist Medical Center referenced the film to news organizations in explaining how scientists from the medical center are working on a long-term project involving spider silks and potential human regeneration along with deciphering fact and fiction from the film.

On September 30, 2020, it was announced that the upcoming remaster of Marvel's Spider-Man for the PlayStation 5 would be adding an exclusive suit based on the costume featured in the first film, titled the "Amazing Suit". The suit was made available since the game's launch on November 12, 2020 as a digital bonus for the Ultimate Edition of Spider-Man: Miles Morales.

Other media

A video game of the same name developed by Beenox was announced at the 2011 New York Comic Con. They were the development team behind the previous two Spider-Man games, Spider-Man: Shattered Dimensions and Spider-Man: Edge of Time. The game was released on June 26, 2012, in Xbox 360, PlayStation 3, personal computer, Nintendo Wii, Nintendo DS and Nintendo 3DS. Dee Brown of Beenox noted, "The fact that our game is based on the movie, and the movie is re-approaching the universe in a completely different way—a more grounded, more realistic approach—gives us an incredible setting to play with". The game takes place after the events of the film. Sony and Gameloft teamed up again to create an official mobile game for the film. Sky Betting and Gaming's online casino website Sky Vegas created a related casino game.

The comic was released in June, named The Amazing Spider-Man: The Movie #1–2, written by Tom Cohen and illustrated by Neil Edwards. A trade paperback was published collecting the two-parter a week before the film's release, entitled The Amazing Spider-Man: The Movie Prelude, which also included The Amazing Spider-Man issues #75–77.

The soundtrack album of the film was released the same day as the film, under the Sony Classical banner.

Sequel

The Amazing Spider-Man was originally reported as being the first of at least three films to the trilogy. The sequel, The Amazing Spider-Man 2 was released on May 2, 2014. On June 17, 2013, Sony announced two more sequels to follow The Amazing Spider-Man 2, which were scheduled to release on June 10, 2016, and May 4, 2018, respectively. However, in July 2014, the third film was delayed to an unspecified date in 2018.

In November 2013, Sony Pictures Entertainment chief Michael Lynton told analysts, "We do very much have the ambition about creating a bigger universe around Spider-Man. There are a number of scripts in the works". A Venom spin-off had been in early stages of planning at the studio since 2008. In December 2013, Sony announced plans for spin-offs featuring the supervillains Sinister Six and Venom.

Marvel Cinematic Universe

In February 2015, Sony Pictures and Marvel Studios announced that Spider-Man would appear in the Marvel Cinematic Universe (MCU), with the character first appearing in 2016's Captain America: Civil War. Sony released Spider-Man: Homecoming, which was produced by Kevin Feige and Amy Pascal, on July 7, 2017, and will continue to finance, distribute, own and have final creative control of the Spider-Man films. Marvel Studios will also explore opportunities to integrate other characters of the Marvel Cinematic Universe into future Spider-Man films. Spider-Man: No Way Home (2021) features Andrew Garfield and Rhys Ifans reprising their respective roles as Peter Parker / Spider-Man, and Dr. Curt Connors / Lizard as both are transported to the MCU.

Notes

References

Further reading
 Paur, Joey. Sam Raimi finally sees The Amazing Spider-Man Geek Tyrant. March 2013

External links

 
 
 

2012 3D films
2012 science fiction films
2012 films
2012 science fiction action films
2010s superhero films
2010s American films
American science fiction action films
Films about bioterrorism
Columbia Pictures films
Fictional portrayals of the New York City Police Department
Films about the New York City Police Department
Films about genetic engineering
Films about terrorism
Films set in 2013
Films set in New York City
Films set in New York (state)
Films shot in New York City
Films shot in Los Angeles
Films directed by Marc Webb
Films produced by Avi Arad
Films produced by Matt Tolmach
Films scored by James Horner
Films using motion capture
IMAX films
Reboot films
Films with screenplays by Steve Kloves
Films with screenplays by Alvin Sargent
Films with screenplays by James Vanderbilt
Spider-Man films
Films about spiders
Teen superhero films
Articles containing video clips
American 3D films
The Amazing Spider-Man (2012 film series)
2010s English-language films
Live-action films based on Marvel Comics